Joel Kauffman (born December 9, 1985) is an American stock car racing driver. He was the driver of the No. 12 Supercuts Dodge Charger for FitzBradshaw Racing in the NASCAR Busch Series.

Racing career
Kauffman began his racing career at the age of ten when he began racing mini-sprints in Indiana. When he was twelve, he became the youngest driver in the National Modified Midget Association to have finished in the top-three in the points standings. In the year 2000, he began running asphalt races, and won the CRA Kendall Late Model Series Rookie of the Year award in 2001 and won the CRA Sunoco Super Series championship the very next year.

In 2003, Kauffman ran the United Speed Alliance Racing Series, and won Rookie of the Year that season. He eventually caught the eye of FitzBradshaw Racing. He made his NASCAR debut at the Kroger 200 in 2005, starting 26th and finishing 25th. He ran six more races that season, his best finish being a 22nd at the Ford 300. He was slated to drive for FitzBradshaw Racing full-time in the Busch Series, along with teammate, Tracy Hines, both competing for Rookie of the Year. However, about halfway through the season, Kauffman was released due to a lack of performance and did not compete in NASCAR again after that.

Motorsports career results

NASCAR
(key) (Bold – Pole position awarded by qualifying time. Italics – Pole position earned by points standings or practice time. * – Most laps led.)

Busch Series

ARCA Re/Max Series
(key) (Bold – Pole position awarded by qualifying time. Italics – Pole position earned by points standings or practice time. * – Most laps led.)

References

External links
 

1985 births
American Speed Association drivers
Living people
NASCAR drivers
CARS Tour drivers
People from LaGrange, Indiana
Racing drivers from Indiana
ARCA Menards Series drivers